Nang Ngumiti ang Langit (International title: Michaela / ) is a 2019 Philippine drama television series starring Sophia Reola. The series was aired on ABS-CBN's PrimeTanghali noontime block and worldwide on The Filipino Channel from March 25 to October 18, 2019, replacing Playhouse and was replaced by I Have a Lover.

Premise
Michaela "Mikmik" Dimaano is a bright, wise cracking 9-year-old girl living happily with her mother Ella and her adoptive grandmother Ester in a quiet province. Everything changes when Ella is diagnosed with late onset leukemia, the same time Mikmik discovers her true relations to Divina Salvador, a wealthy businesswoman. In order to pay for her mother's medication, Mikmik, with the help of Ester, visits Divina but is rejected, as Ella is blamed for her step-brother Eric’s death. Ella then dies, and Mikmik is taken by Ruth, her late mother's best friend, to live with the Salvadors.

The Salvador family consists of the matriarch, Divina – the wife of the late Gabriel Salvador and head of El Salvador Builders, Katrina – a business executive and wife of Divina’s late son Eric, and Katrina’s daughters: the harsh and envious Amber, and the misguided but kind hearted Britney. Mikmik immediately finds refuge and comfort in Benjie and Ruth's son Joseph, but has to face the spite and cruelties of her cold step-grandmother Divina, her wicked step-aunt Katrina, and her older step-cousin Amber. Divina and Katrina’s hatred stem from the fact that Mikmik is the only rightful heir to the Salvador wealth: Ella is the legitimate child of Gabriel as his marriage with her mother Letty was not annulled, making Divina a mistress, and Eric was Divina's adoptive son, due to the fact she cannot bear children.

When a mysterious man from the past named Michael Villaluna resurfaces and creates a paternal connection with Mikmik, things escalate to greater heights. As family feuds worsen, no lies will remain undiscovered, no secrets will remain unrevealed, and eventually Mikmik will get the happiness and the complete family that she truly deserves.

Cast and characters

Main cast
 Sophia Reola as Michaela "Mikmik" S. Villaluna
 Cristine Reyes as Katrina Balingit-Salvador 
 RK Bagatsing as Michael Villaluna
 Enzo Pineda as James Villaluna
 Shaina Magdayao as Grace E. Andrada

Supporting cast
 Pilar Pilapil as Doña Divina Salvador
 Dante Rivero as Don David Villaluna
 Matet de Leon as Ruth Estacio-Dimagmaliw
 Keempee de Leon as Benjamin "Benjie" Dimagmaliw
 Ces Quesada as Ester Dimaano
 Michelle Vito as Anna Defensor
 Vance Larena as Kokoy Santos
 Moi Bien as Barbie Dimaculangan
 Lotlot Bustamante as Marilyn Ledesma
 Pat Liwanag as Chichi Magbanua
 Hyubs Azarcon as Leroy "Roy" B. Gonzales
 Ethyl Anne Osorio as Sarah Perez 
 Teroy Guzman as Atty. Reynante "Nante" Castillo
 Nina Ricci Alagao as Atty. Liberty Sandejas
 Heart Ramos as Britney B. Salvador
 Krystal Mejes as Amber B. Salvador 
 Miguel Vergara as Joseph E. Dimagmaliw

Guest cast
 Kaye Abad as Ella D. Salvador
 Rafa Siguion-Reyna as Eric Salvador
 Isay Alvarez as Leticia "Letty" Dimaano-Salvador
 Leo Rialp as Gabriel Salvador
 Tetchie Agbayani as Elizabeth Villaluna
 Carlos Morales as Lloyd
 Jaycee Parker as Glenda
 Rhed Bustamante as young Ella
 Hannah Lopez Vito as young Anna
 Gwen Zamora as young Divina
 Mico Palanca as young Gabriel
 Jennica Garcia as young Letty
 Victor Silayan as young Nante
 Veyda Inoval as young Katrina
 Izzy Canillo as young Michael
 Althea Ruedas as young Mikmik
 Malou Canzana as Alexis
 Levi Ignacio as Rogelio
 Paolo Serrano as Victor
 JB Agustin as Biboy
 Isaac Reodica as Rocky
 Elisia Parmisano as Rachel
 Althea Guanzon as Diana
 Pipay Navarro as Ashley
 Kazumi Porquez as province kid

Broadcast
Nang Ngumiti ang Langit premiered on ABS-CBN on March 25, 2019.

Timeslot Block

It was the last late-morning drama series to be produced by the network before the COVID-19 pandemic and its shutdown in May 2020.

Reruns
Three reruns of Nang Ngumiti ang Langit were aired from 2020 to 2022. The first was on the cable channel Jeepney TV every weeknights from January 6, 2020, to March 13, 2020. It then aired on Kapamilya Channel and the free-to-air channel A2Z every weekday afternoons from July 26, 2021, to February 18, 2022, replacing the reruns of Magpahanggang Wakas before being replaced by the reruns of Be My Lady. Finally, it also aired on the YouTube-based channel Kapamilya Online Live every Tuesday to Saturday from August 4, 2022, to September 23, 2022, succeeding the reruns of Marinella and preceding the reruns of Ang Munting Paraiso.

Ratings

See also
 List of programs broadcast by ABS-CBN
 List of ABS-CBN drama series

References

External links
 
 

ABS-CBN drama series
2019 Philippine television series debuts
2019 Philippine television series endings
Filipino-language television shows
Television shows filmed in the Philippines
Television series about dysfunctional families